George Southall (1880 – after 1907) was an English professional footballer who played in the Football League for Birmingham.

Southall was born in Quarry Bank, which was then in Staffordshire. He began his football career in local football, and gained a reputation as both a goalscorer and a creator of chances while with Stourbridge. He joined Birmingham in December 1905, and made his debut in the First Division on 7 April 1906 in a goalless draw at Derby County. Though given a decent run of games, he was unable to perform at his best, so he returned to non-league football where he was again successful.

References

1880 births
Year of death missing
People from Brierley Hill
English footballers
Association football outside forwards
Stourbridge F.C. players
Birmingham City F.C. players
Halesowen Town F.C. players
Dudley Town F.C. players
Lye Town F.C. players
English Football League players
Date of birth missing
Place of death missing